Svetlana Koroleva may refer to:

Svetlana Koroleva (model) (born 1983), Russian model
Svetlana Koroleva (water polo) (born 1973), Kazakhstani waterpolo player